The [Book of the] Songs of Dzitbalché, originally titled The Book of the Dances of the Ancients, is the source of almost all the ancient Mayan lyric poems that have survived, and is closely connected to the Books of Chilam Balam, sacred books of the colonial Yucatec Maya. The sole surviving copy of the Songs of Dzitbalché was written in alphabetic Mayan in the 18th century.

The author identifies himself as Ah Bam, an elder of the town of Dzitbalché. He appears to say that the book was originally written in 1440. Manuscripts of this era were often copies of copies of copies, so scholars have to look at internal evidence for clues to the original date of composition. Many of the poems appear to be much older than the manuscript, and contain ancient ceremonial and ritual material. Other poems are songs of love, philosophy, and spirituality. Many of them appear to have had a musical accompaniment.

The Book of the Dances of the Ancients, its original name, was changed to the current title by its first translator.

Publication
The first full Spanish translation was crafted by Barrera Vásquez in 1965. In 1982, Edmunson produced an English version, followed by Curl's on-line publication in 2005 of selected pieces from the codex. Bowles, in 2013, composed English-verse translations of all of the songs in his Flower, Song, Dance: Aztec and Mayan Poetry.

See also
Index of Mexico-related articles

References

  
  
  
  
 
 
 
 
 
 
 

Mayan literature
Yucatec Maya language